Hacker Culture is a cultural criticism book written by Douglas Thomas that deals with hacker ethics and hackers.

Reception 
Publishers Weekly reviewed Hacker Culture as "an intelligent and approachable book on one of the most widely discussed and least understood subcultures in recent decades."

San Francisco Chronicle reviewed Hacker Culture as "an unusually balanced history of the computer underground and its sensational representation in movies and newspapers."

References

External links 
University of Minnesota Press

2002 non-fiction books
Computer books
Hacker culture
Books about computer hacking